Pappan Narippatta (Padmanabhan) is an Indian film director from Narippatta, vadakara in Kozhikode district, Kerala. He made his directorial debut with the family entertainer Kottappurathe Koottukudumbam in 1997. The second movie was Malabaril Ninnoru Manimaaran in 1998.

Filmography

As director

As associate director

As assistant director

References

Living people
1960 births
Film directors from Kerala
Malayalam film directors
People from Kozhikode district
20th-century Indian film directors